Baraeus is a genus of longhorn beetles of the subfamily Lamiinae, containing the following species:

 Baraeus aurisecator Thomson, 1858
 Baraeus gabonicus Breuning, 1961
 Baraeus gracilentus Breuning, 1939
 Baraeus granulosus (Breuning, 1938)
 Baraeus itzingeri Breuning, 1935
 Baraeus orientalis Aurivillius, 1907
 Baraeus plagiatus (Hintz, 1919)
 Baraeus subvittatus Breuning, 1955
 Baraeus taeniolatus (Chevrolat, 1857)
 Baraeus tridentatus (Fabricius, 1801)
 Baraeus vittatus Aurivillius, 1913

References

Pteropliini